Wrzos is a village in Radom County, Masovian Voivodeship, in east-central Poland.

Wrzos may also refer to:
 Wrzos (film), a 1938 Polish film
 Jerzy Wrzos (born 1936), Polish football manager

See also